Ahmed Abdul-Ridha (born 2 April 1997) is an Iraqi footballer who plays as a midfielder for Al-Naft in the Iraqi Premier League.

International career
On 7 June 2017, Abdul-Ridha made his debut against South Korea played in UAE in a friendly, which ended in a 0–0 draw.

Honors

Club
Al-Quwa Al-Jawiya
 AFC Cup
2016 Winner
 2017 Winner
 2018 Winner
 Iraqi Premier League:
16-17  Winner

References

1997 births
Living people
Iraqi footballers
Iraq international footballers
Association football defenders
Al-Quwa Al-Jawiya players
AFC Cup winning players